The University of Public Health, Yangon is the premier university of public health in Myanmar. Founded in 2007, the university offers only graduate and post-graduate degree programs: Master of Public Health (MPH), PhD in Public Health, Diploma in Medical Science and Diploma in Medical Education. The university is a member of the South-East Asia Public Health Education Institution Network (SEAPHEIN).

Location
It is located at the heart of Yangon. The full address is 246, Myo Ma Kyaung street, corner of Bo Gyoke Aung San Road and Lamadaw street, Latha, Yangon. It is just across the road in front of University of Medicine 1 which was the oldest medical school in Myanmar.

History
The university was founded in 2007 to strengthen the public health system (including human resources for public health) and infrastructure in Myanmar. It is to help strengthen referral systems by providing technical back-up. Referral facilities for primary, secondary and tertiary care are important to effective community health work. Current dean of the school is Professor Nay Soe Maung who has served as an army doctor up to the rank of a colonel. He is ex-husband of one of the daughters of former Myanmar Junta head.

Entrance
Physicians(M.B.B.S), dentists(B.D.S), nurses(B.N.Sc) and health assistants(B.Comm.H)  are allowed to enter this school. Medical doctors and community/public health professions who are working in government service can enroll the UOPH via entrance exam. Applicant must be under 50 years old. They also finished the training of Central Institute of Civil Service in Myanmar. It is under authority of Ministry of Health in Myanmar.

See also
 University of Community Health, Magway

References

External links
Official website

4.Myanma Alinn Daily Newspaper in 2013-06-15

Universities and colleges in Yangon
Medical schools in Myanmar
Universities and colleges in Myanmar
Educational institutions established in 2007
2007 establishments in Myanmar